The secretary of state of Washington is an independently elected constitutional officer in the executive branch of the government of the U.S. state of Washington. Fifteen individuals have held the office of Secretary of State since statehood. The incumbent is Steve Hobbs, a Democrat.

Qualifications

To hold office as Secretary of State, a person must be a United States citizen registered to vote in the state of Washington, provide a $10,000 surety bond to the state conditioned on faithful execution of the duties of office, and reside in the city of Olympia, Washington, by the time of inauguration. Only the governor, state treasurer and secretary of state are constitutionally required to live in the capital city.

Powers and duties
The secretary of state is in effect the guarantor of the continuity and stability of good government in Washington, with his or her role extending to the certification, filing, and preservation of public records, the supervision of all aspects of state and local elections, and the registration and regulatory oversight of businesses and charities.

Records management
The secretary of state is the keeper of the Seal of Washington as prescribed by the constitution, and as such is responsible for regulating its use and certifying to the official acts of the Legislature and governor. In this role, the secretary of state has additional duties related to the disposition of state honors and records including regulating the use of the Washington State flag and is an ex officio non-voting member of the committees for the Washington Medal of Valor and the Washington Medal of Merit. Similarly, the secretary of state directs and supervises Washington's state archives and state library. The state archives coordinates the preservation and management of public records across government, whereas the state library maintains libraries in correctional and mental health institutions and supports scholarly study of its vast research collections.

Election administration
The Elections Division of the Office of the Secretary of State has general oversight of election administration throughout the state, with individual county auditors being responsible for candidate registration, ballot preparation, polling, and canvassing. The secretary of state exercises this constitutional power, duty, and authority as chief election officer by accrediting the balloting procedures used by each county, certifying the results of elections, verifying petition signatures used to qualify initiatives and referendums, and distributing the state voter's pamphlet and official notice of elections advertisements. Lobbying and campaign finance are separately regulated by the Washington State Public Disclosure Commission.

Business registration
The Corporations Division of the Office of the Secretary of State registers a variety of business associations by virtue of the secretary of state's role as company register, including corporations, cooperatives, limited liability companies, limited liability partnerships, limited partnerships, assumed business names, and trademarks. The secretary also regulates charities and charitable trusts, including registering individuals, organizations and commercial fundraisers involved in charitable solicitations. Unlike in some other states however, the secretary of state is not responsible for commissioning notaries or recording liens or financing statements under the Uniform Commercial Code. Those functions are instead performed by the Washington State Department of Licensing.

Miscellaneous duties
A variety of miscellaneous duties have been assigned to the secretary of state through statute, including coordination of the state's Address Confidentiality Program and administration of the state's workplace giving program, "the Combined Fund Drive". Constitutionally speaking, the Secretary of State is likewise second (behind the lieutenant governor) in the line of succession to the office of Governor of Washington.

List of Washington secretaries of state

The State of Washington has had a total of sixteen secretaries of state:

See also
The Washington Medal of Merit
 List of company registers

References

External links
Official homepage of the Washington Secretary of State
List of previous Washington Secretaries of State
Washington State Elections Top 2 Primary FAQ